Gnat is a surname. Notable people with this surname include:

 Ashleigh Gnat (born 1994), American gymnast
 Edward Gnat (1940–2021), Polish politician
 Rodney Gnat (born 1987), American football player

See also
 

Polish-language surnames